Ancylonotopsis is a genus of longhorn beetles of the subfamily Lamiinae.

 Ancylonotopsis albomarmoratus (Breuning, 1938)
 Ancylonotopsis benjamini (Breuning, 1949)
 Ancylonotopsis duffyi Breuning, 1958
 Ancylonotopsis fuscopictus Breuning, 1970
 Ancylonotopsis fuscosignatus Breuning, 1961
 Ancylonotopsis girardi Breuning & Téocchi, 1977
 Ancylonotopsis nigrovittipennis Breuning & Téocchi, 1977
 Ancylonotopsis parvus Breuning, 1938
 Ancylonotopsis pictoides Breuning, 1974
 Ancylonotopsis pictus Breuning, 1951
 Ancylonotopsis rothkirchi (Breuning, 1956)

References

Ancylonotini